Pan Qiang (born 21 January 1985) is a Chinese sports shooter. He competed in the men's double trap event at the 2016 Summer Olympics.

References

External links
 

1985 births
Living people
Chinese male sport shooters
Olympic shooters of China
Shooters at the 2016 Summer Olympics
Place of birth missing (living people)
Universiade medalists in shooting
Asian Games medalists in shooting
Asian Games gold medalists for China
Shooters at the 2010 Asian Games
Medalists at the 2010 Asian Games
Universiade gold medalists for China
Universiade silver medalists for China
Medalists at the 2011 Summer Universiade
21st-century Chinese people